Ossi Teileri (26 November 1911 – 23 December 1988) was a Finnish middle-distance runner. He competed in the men's 1500 metres at the 1936 Summer Olympics.

References

External links

1911 births
1988 deaths
Athletes (track and field) at the 1936 Summer Olympics
Finnish male middle-distance runners
Olympic athletes of Finland